Driven from Home is a 1927 American silent drama film directed by James Young and starring Ray Hallor, Virginia Lee Corbin and Pauline Garon.

Cast
 Ray Hallor
 Virginia Lee Corbin
 Pauline Garon
 Sôjin Kamiyama
 Anna May Wong
 Melbourne MacDowell
 Margaret Seddon
 Sheldon Lewis
 Virginia Pearson
 Eric Mayne
 Alfred Fisher

References

Bibliography
 Munden, Kenneth White. The American Film Institute Catalog of Motion Pictures Produced in the United States, Part 1. University of California Press, 1997.

External links
 

1927 films
1927 drama films
1920s English-language films
American silent feature films
Silent American drama films
Films directed by James Young
American black-and-white films
1920s American films